Ladislav Vácha (21 March 1899 in Brno – 28 June 1943) was a Czech gymnast and Olympic champion competing for Czechoslovakia.

He competed at the 1924 Summer Olympics in Paris, where he received a bronze medal in rope climbing and rings. He received a gold medal in parallel bars, and silver medals in rings and team combined exercises at the 1928 Summer Olympics in Amsterdam.

He died during World War II shortly after being interrogated by Gestapo for his resistance activities.

References

1899 births
1943 deaths
Sportspeople from Brno
Czechoslovak male artistic gymnasts
Gymnasts at the 1920 Summer Olympics
Gymnasts at the 1924 Summer Olympics
Gymnasts at the 1928 Summer Olympics
Olympic gymnasts of Czechoslovakia
Olympic gold medalists for Czechoslovakia
Olympic silver medalists for Czechoslovakia
Olympic bronze medalists for Czechoslovakia
Olympic medalists in gymnastics
Medalists at the 1928 Summer Olympics
Medalists at the 1924 Summer Olympics
Czechoslovak civilians killed in World War II
Resistance members killed by Nazi Germany
Czech resistance members